Bende Velin (born 5 September 1934) is a Danish diver. She competed in the women's 10 metre platform event at the 1960 Summer Olympics.

References

1934 births
Living people
Danish female divers
Olympic divers of Denmark
Divers at the 1960 Summer Olympics
Divers from Copenhagen